Independent Operational Group Silesia (Polish: Samodzielna Grupa Operacyjna Śląsk, SGO Śląsk) was an Operational Group of the Polish Army, created in September 1938 to annex Trans-Olza (Zaolzie) from Czechoslovakia.

History
The Group was commanded by General Władysław Bortnowski and comprised several Army units and five air squadrons. Altogether, 35,966 Polish officers and soldiers participated in the annexation of Zaolzie. 

The Group comprised mostly units of the 4th Infantry Division, as well as regiments of the 14th Infantry Division, 15th Infantry Division, 16th Infantry Division, 23rd Infantry Division, 25th Infantry Division, and 21st Mountain Infantry Division. Additionally, a cavalry regiment was created, comprising units of the Wielkopolska Cavalry Brigade and the Pomeranian Cavalry Brigade.

Annexation of Zaolzie region

After its creation, the military unit was stationed near the borders of Poland and Czechoslovakia.

As a result of the Munich crisis, the Czechoslovak government yielded to Polish pressure and gave up a part of the Cieszyn Silesia region (namely Trans-Olza/Zaolzie) to Poland (as demanded by Poland under a threat of military action). The Independent Operational Group Silesia was carrying out the annexation from 2 to 11 October 1938.

Group termination
On 9 December 1938 the Independent Operational Group Silesia was ordered to leave the occupied territory and the group was dissolved after that.

See also
Trans-Olza
History of Poland (1918-1939)
Edmund Charaszkiewicz
Feliks Ankerstein

Sources 

 Marek Piotr Deszczyński, Ostatni egzamin. Wojsko Polskie wobec kryzysu czechosłowackiego 1938-1939 (The Final Exam: The Polish Armed Forces in the Czechoslovak Crisis of 1938–1939), Warsaw, 2003.

External links
 Grupa Rekonstrukcji Historycznej: Grupa Operacyjna "Śląsk" (Group for Historic Reconstruction: Operational Group Silesia), accessed 24 November 2008.

Military units and formations established in 1938
Army units and formations of Poland
Military units and formations disestablished in 1938
Borders of Poland
Cieszyn Silesia
Czechoslovakia–Poland relations